Los Cipreses S.A., doing business as Buquebus, is a Uruguayan company that operates ferry services from Buenos Aires to Montevideo and Colonia. The company also operates a fleet of coaches to Termas del Arapey, Termas del Dayman, Salto, Uruguay, Carmelo, Atlántida, Punta del Este, La Paloma, La Pedrera and Punta del Diablo from Montevideo, Colonia and Piriapolis.

The company also operated BQB Líneas Aéreas.

Fleet

Buquebus operates a fleet of nine fast ferries.

The Buquebus website also lists HSC Catalonia, which has been chartered to P&O Ferries as HSC Express for several years.

A new ferry named Francisco, after Pope Francis, was completed by Incat in 2013. Capable of 107 km/h (58 knots) it will be one of the fastest ferries in the world, and will be used for the Buenos Aires to Montevideo route. It has a capacity of 1,024 passengers and crew and 150 cars.

See also 
BQB Líneas Aéreas, former Buquebus-owned airline.

References

External links

Transport companies of Uruguay
Water transport in Uruguay
Water transport in Argentina
Transport companies of Argentina